Massachusetts's sixteenth congressional district is an obsolete district. It was also for a short time in the early 19th century a Massachusetts District of Maine. It was eliminated in 1933 after the 1930 Census. Its last location was in eastern Massachusetts at Cape Cod.

Cities and towns in the district

1910s
"Barnstable County: Towns of Barnstable, Bourne, Brewster, Chatham, Dennis, Eastham, Falmonth, Harwich, Mashpee, Orleans, Provincetown, Sandwich, Truro, Wellfleet, and Yarmouth. Bristol County: City of New Bedford; towns of Acushnet, Dartmouth, and
Fairhaven. Plymouth County: Towns of Bridgewater, Carver, Duxbury, Halifax, Hanover,
Hanson, Hingham, Hull, Kingston, Marion, Marshfield, Mattapoisett, Middleboro, Norwell, Pembroke, Plymouth, Plympton, Rochester, Scituate, and Wareham. Norfolk County: Town of Cohasset. Dukes and Nantucket Counties."

List of members representing the district

References

 Congressional Biographical Directory of the United States 1774–present
 

16
Former congressional districts of the United States
Constituencies established in 1803
Constituencies disestablished in 1933
1803 establishments in Massachusetts
1933 disestablishments in Massachusetts